Live 95 is a radio station in Ireland owned by Wireless Group, broadcasting mainly to Limerick city and county, in Ireland.

History

The station was launched from O'Connell Street in Limerick as "New 95fm" on 6 November 1997, replacing Limerick 95, after Limerick 95 lost its license to broadcast. The 95FM frequency was on the test tone before "New 95fm" took over. "Dreams", by Limerick band The Cranberries, was the first song to be aired on the station. In the 1990s, the station began to increase in listeners. In the year 2000, the radio station moved to a new base in Radio House on the Dock Road in Limerick and changed its name from "New 95fm" to "Limerick's Live 95fm".

Rebrand
In February 2019, the station rebranded from "Limerick's Live 95fm" to "Live 95", with an updated tagline of 'Limerick's Best Music Mix'.

Live 95 was reportedly the most listened-to radio station in Limerick city and county as of 2018-2019. Over 100,000 Limerick people tuned in to Live 95 weekly, according to Ipsos/MRBI JNLR radio listenership figures covering the 12 months up to September 2019.

As of 2019, the station's schedule included Breakfast with Mark and Catriona, the Limerick Today Show with Joe Nash, Afternoons with Declan Copues, a drivetime show and Live at Night with JP Dillon.

Live 95 is involved with several local Limerick charities, including CARI Limerick, Cliona's, and the Children's Grief Centre.

Frequencies

References

External links
 

Radio stations in the Republic of Ireland
Radio stations established in 1997
Culture in Limerick (city)
Mass media in County Limerick
Wireless Group